Lieutenant General Sven Evert Folke Rehnström (3 November 1942 – 1 September 2020) was a senior Swedish Army officer. Rehnström served as Chief of the Joint Forces Directorate from 1998 to 2002.

Early life
Rehnström was born on 3 November 1942 in Halmstad Parish, Halland County, Sweden. Rehnström graduated from the Military Academy Karlberg in 1967 and was commissioned as an officer the same year in Wendes Artillery Regiment.

Career
He attended the Artillery Officers' School at the Artillery and Engineering Officers School from 1969 to 1970, and was promoted to captain in 1972. Rehnström attended the Swedish Armed Forces Staff College from 1972 to 1975. In August 1975, the then captain Rehnström of Wendes Regiment, was awarded the Royal Swedish Army Staff College Association Scholarship Fund's (Föreningen krigshögskolans stipendiefond) scholarship for 1975. The scholarship, which was SEK 3,000, was awarded in connection with the Swedish Armed Forces Staff College's higher 2-year courses. Rehnström received the scholarship for demonstrated outstanding skill. It was to be used for military science studies abroad. He then served in the Army Staff from 1975 to 1980 (from 1977 as office head), and was part-time teacher of general tactics at the Artillery and Engineering Regimental Officers School from 1976 to 1981. He was promoted to major in 1978, and then served in the Program Department in the Planning Command (Planeringsledningen) in the Defence Staff from 1980 to 1981. Rehnström was posted to Småland Artillery Regiment between 1981 and 1983.

In 1983, he was promoted to lieutenant colonel, after which he was head of the Program Department in the Planning Command from 1983 to 1986. Rehnström served in the System Department in the Main Department for Army Equipment in the Defence Materiel Administration from 1986 to 1987 and as battalion commander in Karlskrona Coastal Artillery Regiment from 1987 to 1988. He was promoted to colonel in 1989, whereupon he was Deputy Director-General of the Defence Materiel Administration from 1989 to 1994. Rehnström was promoted to major general in 1991. Thereafter he was deputy director-general (departementsråd) in Ministry of Defence from 1994 to 1995 and then served as Chief of Staff in Northern Military District from 1995 to 1996. Rehnström was promoted to lieutenant general in 1996 and was director and head of the Main Unit for the Military Part of the Total Defense in the Ministry of Defence from 1996 to 1998. Rehnström was then the first Chief of the Joint Forces Directorate (Krigsförbandsledningen) in the Swedish Armed Forces Headquarters from 1998 to 2002.

Personal life
He was married to Gunilla (Nilla).

Dates of rank
1967 – Second lieutenant
19?? – Lieutenant
1972 – Captain
1978 – Major
1983 – Lieutenant colonel
1989 – Colonel
 – Senior colonel
1 July 1989 – Major general
1996 – Lieutenant general

Honours
Member of the Royal Swedish Academy of War Sciences (1986)

Footnotes

References

1942 births
2020 deaths
Swedish Army lieutenant generals
People from Halmstad
Members of the Royal Swedish Academy of War Sciences